Technicolour was a Finnish rock band from Helsinki, founded by Jimi Pääkallo and active from 2001 to 2008. All the lyrics to their songs were sung in English.

Jimi and Dingo had been playing in the band Cliché when they decided to start a separate project. Gary, Aki, and Toni joined soon after.

The band's first album, Way Out, was released in September 2003. The album achieved moderate success. Their second album, Only Shadows Dance (2005), outperformed the first one, peaking at 11th place on the album chart that year. The album's singles "All My Life" and "Teach Me Love (I'm in Denial)" also ranked among the top ten on radio playlists. With their third album People, released in October 2006, Technicolour's popularity waned again.

In May 2008, the band announced that they would go on hiatus, and in October of the same year they officially broke up.

Tecnicolour's band members have continued playing music in other projects. Vocalist Jimi Pääkallo launched a solo career under the name Jimi Constantine, Gary focused his efforts on the band Monday, which he had started in 2004, and Toni plays with the bands Kardia and The Closed.

Past members
 Jimi (Konstantinos Jorma "Konsta" Hiekkanen) – vocals
 Gary (Tuomas Keskinen) – guitar
 Toni Hintikka – bass
 Dingo (Pasi Lemmetty) – drums
 Aki Räty – vocals, guitar

Discography

Studio albums
 Way Out (2003)
 Only Shadows Dance (2005)
 People (2006)

Singles
 "One Night" (2003)
 "Fireflies" (2003)
 "Endless" (2004)
 "All My Life" (2005)
 "Teach Me Love" (I'm in Denial)" (2005)
 "Nowhere to Go" (2005)
 "Can I Get to Heaven" (2006)
 "Someday" (2006)
 "Michael Jackson" (2006)

Music videos
 "Fireflies" (2003)
 "Teach Me Love (I'm in Denial)" (2005)
 "Nowhere to Go" (2005)
 "Someday" (2006)

References

External links
 Official website (archived)
 Technicolour's official mobile blog (archived)

Musical groups established in 2001
Finnish rock music groups
Finnish musical groups
Musical groups from Helsinki